National Highway 114 (NH 114) is a  National Highway in India. It links Mallarpur, Sainthia, Ahmedpur, Bolpur, Bhedia, Guskara, Talit and Barddhaman in the state of West Bengal.

References

National highways in India
Transport in Birbhum district